Sea Raiders is a 1941 Universal film serial starring the Dead End Kids and Little Tough Guys.  This was the teen stars' second of three serials, between Junior G-Men (1940) and Junior G-Men of the Air (1942).  Sea Raiders was the 52nd serial to be released by Universal (or the 120th if silent serials are counted).  The plot concerns the heroes foiling Nazi attacks on American shipping.

Plot
The Sea Raiders, a band of foreign agents, led by Carl Tonjes, and secretly by Elliott Carlton, blow up a freighter on which Billy Adams and Toby Nelson have stowed away to avoid Brack Warren, a harbor patrol officer assigned to guard a new type of torpedo boat built by Billy's brother, Tom Adams. Intended targets or not, getting blown up does not set well with Billy and Toby and, together with their gang coupled with the members of the Little Tough Guys, they find the Sea Raiders' island hideout, investigate the seacoast underground arsenal of these saboteurs, get blasted from the air, dragged to their doom, become victims of the storm, entombed in a tunnel and even periled by a panther before they don the uniforms of some captured Sea Raiders and board a yacht that serves as headquarters for the Raiders.

Cast

The Dead End Kids and the Little Tough Guys
 Billy Halop as Billy Adams 
 Huntz Hall as Toby Nelson
 Gabriel Dell as Bilge 
 Bernard Punsly as Butch 
 Hally Chester as Swab
 Joe Recht as Lug

Additional principal cast
 Reed Hadley as Carl Tonjes 
 William Hall as Brack Warren
 Mary Field as Aggie Nelson 
 John McGuire as Tom Adams 
 Marcia Ralston as Leah Carlton
 Edward Keane as Elliott Carlton 
 Stanley Blystone as Captain Olaf Nelson, chief henchman 
 Richard Alexander as Henchman Jenkins 
 Ernie Adams as Henchman Zeke

Production

Stunts
 Bud Geary
 Eddie Parker doubling Eddie Dunn
 Tom Steele doubling Reed Hadley
 Dale Van Sickel
 Bud Wolfe doubling Richard Bond, Morgan Wallace & John McGuire
 Duke York doubling Huntz Hall

Chapter titles
 The Raider Strikes
 Flaming Torture
 The Tragic Crash
 The Raider Strikes Again
 Flames of Fury
 Blasted from the Air
 Victims of the Storm
 Dragged to Their Doom
 Battling the Sea Beast
 Periled by a Panther
 Entombed in the Tunnel
 Paying the Penalty
Source:

References

External links

1941 films
American World War II propaganda films
American black-and-white films
1940s English-language films
Universal Pictures film serials
Seafaring films
Films directed by Ford Beebe
Films directed by John Rawlins
1941 adventure films
American adventure films